Congenital sensorineural deafness occurs commonly in domestic cats with a white coat. It is a congenital deafness caused by a degeneration of the inner ear. Deafness is far more common in white cats than in those with other coat colours. According to the ASPCA Complete Guide to Cats, "17 to 20 percent of white cats with nonblue eyes are deaf; 40 percent of "odd-eyed" white cats with one blue eye are deaf; and 65 to 85 percent of blue-eyed white cats are deaf."

Charles Darwin mentions this phenomenon in his book, On the Origin of Species, to explain correlated variation.

Domesticated cats with blue eyes and white coats are often completely deaf. Deafness can occur in white cats with yellow, green or blue irises, although it is mostly likely in white cats with blue irises. In white cats with mixed-coloured eyes (odd-eyed cats), it has been found that deafness is more likely to affect the ear on the blue-eyed side. White cats can have blue, gold, green or copper coloured odd eyes.

In one 1997 study of white cats, 72% of the animals were found to be totally deaf. The entire organ of Corti in the cochlea was found to have degenerated in the first few weeks after birth; however, even during these weeks no brain stem responses could be evoked by auditory stimuli, suggesting that these animals had never experienced any auditory sensations. It was found that some months after the organ of Corti had degenerated, the spiral ganglion of the cochlea also began to degenerate.

Genetics
Although few studies have been done to link this to genes known to be involved in human Waardenburg syndrome, a syndrome of hearing loss and depigmentation caused by a genetic disruption to neural crest cell development, such a disruption would lead to this presentation in cats as well. Waardenburg syndrome type 2A (caused by a mutation in MITF) has been found in many other small mammals including dogs, minks and mice, and they all display at least patchy white depigmentation and some degeneration of the cochlea and saccule, as in deaf white cats.

A major gene that causes a cat to have a white coat is a dominant masking gene, an allele of KIT which suppresses pigmentation and hearing. The cat would have an underlying coat colour and pattern, but when the dominant white gene is present, that pattern will not be expressed, and the cat will be deaf. A cat that is homozygous (WW) or heterozygous (Ww) for this gene will have a white coat despite the underlying pattern/colour. A cat that lacks this dominant masking gene (ww) will exhibit a coat colour/pattern. KIT mutations have also led to patchy depigmentation and different coloured irises in humans, and KIT has been found to increase MITF expression, the gene involved in human Waardenburg syndrome type 2A.

A white cat may have blue eyes for reasons other than masking. If the underlying coat pattern is one of a pointed cat (also referred to as a Siamese pattern), the blue eyes may come from the genetics of the pointed gene.

A common misconception is that all white cats with blue eyes are deaf. It is possible to have a cat with a naturally white coat without this gene, as an extreme form of white spotting, although this is rare – some small non-white patch usually remains.

In popular culture 

 The character Snowkit in A Dangerous Path has congenital sensorineural deafness. His condition leads to his death as he fails to hear his mother's warning of the appearance of a predator.

See also 
Cat coat genetics
Merle (dog coat)
Pleiotropy
Van cat
Waardenburg syndrome

References

Cat diseases
Deafness
Hair color